Long Ridge Open Space Preserve is a 2,035 acre open space preserve along Long Ridge in the Santa Cruz Mountains.

Recreation
Long Ridge has 13.5 miles of trails for hiking, mountain biking, and horseback riding, including the Bay Area Ridge Trail which runs through the preserve. Trails connect the preserve with other nearby open space, including Saratoga Gap Open Space Preserve, Skyline Ridge Open Space Preserve, and Upper Stevens Canyon County Park.

Habitat and Wildlife
Much of Long Ridge is grassland, with wildflowers in the spring. The preserve has turkeys, feral pigs, and coyotes.

References

Midpeninsula Regional Open Space District
Protected areas of San Mateo County, California
Nature reserves in California
Santa Cruz Mountains
Bay Area Ridge Trail